Elections to Castlereagh Borough Council were held on 19 May 1993 on the same day as the other Northern Irish local government elections. The election used four district electoral areas to elect a total of 23 councillors.

Election results

Note: "Votes" are the first preference votes.

Districts summary

|- class="unsortable" align="centre"
!rowspan=2 align="left"|Ward
! % 
!Cllrs
! % 
!Cllrs
! %
!Cllrs
! %
!Cllrs
! % 
!Cllrs
!rowspan=2|TotalCllrs
|- class="unsortable" align="center"
!colspan=2 bgcolor="" | DUP
!colspan=2 bgcolor="" | UUP
!colspan=2 bgcolor="" | Alliance
!colspan=2 bgcolor="" | UPUP
!colspan=2 bgcolor="white"| Others
|-
|align="left"|Castlereagh Central
|bgcolor="#D46A4C"|57.4
|bgcolor="#D46A4C"|3
|15.1
|1
|18.6
|1
|0.0
|0
|8.9
|1
|6
|-
|align="left"|Castlereagh East
|bgcolor="#D46A4C"|52.0
|bgcolor="#D46A4C"|3
|8.9
|1
|15.3
|1
|9.3
|1
|14.5
|1
|7
|-
|align="left"|Castlereagh South
|30.5
|1
|31.0
|2
|bgcolor="#F6CB2F"|31.1
|bgcolor="#F6CB2F"|2
|0.0
|0
|7.4
|0
|5
|-
|align="left"|Castlereagh West
|31.8
|2
|bgcolor="40BFF5"|37.9
|bgcolor="40BFF5"|2
|25.6
|1
|0.0
|0
|4.7
|0
|5
|- class="unsortable" class="sortbottom" style="background:#C9C9C9"
|align="left"| Total
|44.1
|9
|21.9
|6
|21.9
|5
|2.8
|1
|9.3
|2
|23
|-
|}

Districts results

Castlereagh Central

1993: 3 x DUP, 1 x Alliance, 1 x UUP, 1 x Independent Unionist

Castlereagh East

1993: 3 x DUP, 1 x Alliance, 1 x UUP, 1 x UPUP, 1 x Independent Unionist

Castlereagh South

1993: 2 x Alliance, 2 x UUP, 1 x DUP

Castlereagh West

1993: 2 x UUP, 2 x DUP, 1 x Alliance

References

Castlereagh Borough Council elections
Castlereagh